{{Infobox river
| name               = Upper Neretva
| name_native        = 
| name_native_lang   = 
| name_other         = Горња Неретва/Gornja Neretva
| nickname           = Nera; Emerald River; Modra rijeka

| image              = 
| image_size         = 
| image_caption      = Protected section of the Upper Neretva canyon, Ćepa (1006 m).
| map                = 
| map_size           = 
| map_caption        = 
| pushpin_map        = 
| pushpin_map_size   = 
| pushpin_map_caption= 

| subdivision_type1  = Country
| subdivision_name1  = Bosnia and Herzegovina
| subdivision_type2  = 
| subdivision_name2  = 
| subdivision_type3  = Region
| subdivision_name3  = South-East Central Bosnia and Herzegovina
| subdivision_type4  = District
| subdivision_name4  = Konjic, Kalinovik, Gacko
| subdivision_type5  = City
| subdivision_name5  = Konjic

| length             = , EW 
| width_min          = 
| width_avg          = 
| width_max          = 
| depth_min          = 
| depth_avg          = 
| depth_max          = 
| discharge1_location= 
| discharge1_min     = 
| discharge1_avg     = 
| discharge1_max     = 

| source1            = Gredelj
| source1_location   = Lebršnik, South-East Central Bosnia and Herzegovina, Bosnia and Herzegovina
| source1_coordinates= 
| source1_elevation  = 
| mouth              = Adriatic
| mouth_location     = Ploče, Dubrovnik-Neretva County, Croatia
| mouth_coordinates  = 
| mouth_elevation    = 
| progression        = 
| waterfalls         = 
| river_system       = Dinaric Alps
| basin_size         = 
| tributaries_left   = Jezernica, the Živašnica (also known as the Živanjski Potok), Ladjanica, Župski Krupac, Bukovica, Šištica, Konjička Bijela
| tributaries_right  = Jezernica (also known as the Tatinac), Gornji i Donji Krupac, Ljuta (also known as the Dindolka), Jesenica, Bjelimićka Rijeka, Slatinica, Račica, Rakitnica, Konjička Ljuta, Trešanica, Neretvica
| custom_label       = 
| custom_data        = 
| extra              = * Total length of the Neretva is 230 km, and part of the river, which is the subject of this article, Upper Neretva, is 90 km. Also, the Neretva changing direction from East–West to North–South, after the exit from the Upper Neretva river section of its course.
}}
Upper Neretva (Горња Неретва), is the upper course of the Neretva river, including vast mountainous area surrounding the Neretva, with numerous human settlements, peaks and forests, numerous streams and well-springs, three major glacial lakes near the river and even more scattered across the mountains of Treskavica and Zelengora, in a wider area of the Upper Neretva with its flora and fauna.

Geographically and historically area has distinct features, while the Neretva is divided into three common hydrological sections: upper, middle and lower.

The Neretva has been harnessed and controlled to a large extent by four HE power-plants with large dams (as higher than 15 meters) and their storage lakes, but it still recognized for its natural beauty, diversity of its landscape and visual attractiveness.

 Geography and hydrography 
The Neretva is largest karst river in the Dinaric Alps in the entire eastern part of the Adriatic basin, which belongs to the Adriatic river watershed. The total length is 230 km, of which 208 km are in Bosnia and Herzegovina, while the final 22 km are in the Dubrovnik-Neretva County of Croatia.
Geographically and hydrographical the Neretva is divided in three section.
The upper course of the Neretva river, called the Upper Neretva, includes vast area around the Neretva, numerous streams and well-springs, three major glacial lakes near the very river and even more scattered across the mountains of Treskavica and Zelengora in wider area of the Upper Neretva, mountains, peaks and forests, flora and fauna of the area. All this natural heritage together with cultural heritage of Upper Neretva, representing rich and valuable resources of Bosnia and Herzegovina as well as Europe.

Course

The Neretva springs are situated deep in the Dinaric Alps at the base of the Zelengora and Lebršnik mountains under the village Jabuka and the saddle Gredelj. The Neretva headwaters run in undisturbed rapids and waterfalls, carving steep gorges reaching 600–800 meters in depth through this remote and rugged limestone terrain.
The upper course of Neretva, Upper Neretva has water of Class I purity and is almost certainly the coldest river water in the world, often as low as 7-8 degrees Celsius in the summer months.First section, Upper Neretva, of the Neretva river from its source at 1,227 m.a.s.l. and headwaters gorge all the way to the town of Konjic is 90 km, flows from south to north-north-west as most of the Bosnia and Herzegovina rivers belonging to the Danube watershed, and cover some 1,390 km2 with average elevation of 1.2%. Right below Konjic, the Neretva briefly expanding into a wide valley which provides fertile agricultural land. There exists the large Jablaničko Lake, artificially formed after construction of a dam near Jablanica.Second section begins from the confluence of the Neretva and the Rama river between Konjic and Jablanica where the Neretva suddenly takes a southern course and enters the largest canyons of its course, running through steep slopes of magnificent mountains of Prenj, Čvrsnica and Čabulja reaching  in depth. From here Neretva flows toward the Adriatic Sea.

 Neretva springs 
The Neretva river rises beneath the mountain saddle known as Gredelj. Spring of the river Neretva consists of five individual well-springs on the forested and steep slopes of Gredelj ridge. They are difficult to access and even harder to find in a very thick forest. For many years place exists at the border of the oldest National Park in Bosnia and Herzegovina, NP Sutjeska with its primeval forest Perućica, but itself never protected.

 Settlements and valleys 
Konjic is the only town in the Upper Neretva. Two largest villages include Ulog and Glavatičevo, with a number of smaller ones, such as Bjelimići, Obalj, Lukomir and other.

 Borač valley 
The Neretva headwaters gorge is actually a broad valley, up to 1 km wide and 20 km long, called Borač. Nevertheless, because of its position among the great mountain chains, in the heart of Bosnia and Herzegovina Dinaric Alps, Borač has a very steep slope and the Neretva river significant (hydrological) elevation. Several major well-sources significantly complement the Neretva river, among which the most important and with largest quantity of fresh and potable water are "Krupac" and "Pridvorica" well-springs. Borač valley, before the Bosnian war, was inhabited mostly by Bosniaks, whose villages were completely destroyed and the people murdered, imprisoned into a concentration camp in Kalinovik and deported mostly to third countries in a broad ethnic cleansing by Serb para-military forces. Some of the villagers now returning to their land, repairing and rebuilding their houses.
The Borač valley ends one kilometer upstream from the entrance to small mountain town of Ulog, where at the same time begins Valley of Ulog.

 Ulog and Ulog valley 
Ulog is a small mountain town in Ulog Valley at the banks of the Upper Neretva river, in the heart of eastern Bosnia and Herzegovina Dinaric Alps, surrounded with great mountain chains of Zelengora, Lelija, Crvanj and Treskavica. Town is formed by Ottomans, on old caravan road from Mostar via Nevesinje en route to Istanbul. From Ulog downstream of the Neretva river is wide valley named Ulog valley. During the Bosnian war, Ulog was suffered extensive destruction from Serb forces, and its civilian population, mostly Bosniaks and some Croats, were completely annihilated, though town and its surrounding never saw significant, if any, battles or military confrontation.

 Glavatičevo and Župa valley 

Glavatičevo is a small village in Bosnia and Herzegovina. The village is located 30 kilometers away from Konjic in a southeast direction, within a wide Župa valley (also Komska Župa and Konjička Župa) ( = ) on both banks of the Neretva river, in Konjic Municipality, Bosnia and Herzegovina.
Dr. Pavao Anđelić in his book "Spomenici Konjica i okoline" claimed that Glavatičevo got its name from the name of the local nobleman Glavat or Glavatec.

 Konjic 

Streams and tributaries
Rivers of the Jezernica (also Tatinac), the Gornji and Donji Krupac, the Ljuta-Dindolka, the Jesenica, the Bjelimićka Rijeka, the Slatinica, the Račica, the Rakitnica, the Konjička Ljuta, the Trešanica, the Neretvica flow into the Neretva from the right, while the Jezernica, the Živašnica (also Živanjski Potok), the Ladjanica, the Župski Krupac, the Bukovica, the Šištica, the Konjička Bijela flow into it from the left.

 Rakitnica river 

Rakitnica is the main tributary of the first section of the Neretva river known as Upper Neretva.  The Rakitnica river formed a 26 km long canyon, of its 32 km length, that stretches between Bjelašnica and Visočica to southeast from Sarajevo.
From canyon, there is a hiking trail along the ridge of the Rakitnica canyon, which drops 800m below, all the way to famous village of Lukomir. Village is the only remaining traditional semi-nomadic, Bosniak, mountain village in Bosnia and Herzegovina.
At almost 1,500m, the village of Lukomir, with its unique stone homes with cherry-wood roof tiles, is the highest and most isolated mountain village in the country. Indeed, access to the village is impossible from the first snows in December until late April and sometimes even later, except by skis or on foot. A newly constructed lodge is now complete to receive guests and hikers.

 Lakes 

 Uloško lake 

 Boračko lake 

 Blatačko lake 

 Jablaničko lake 

Jablaničko Lake is a large artificially formed lake on the Neretva river, right below Konjic where the Neretva briefly expanding into a wide valley. Rivere provided lot of fertile, agricultural land there, before lake flooded most of it.
The lake was created in 1953 after construction of large gravitational a hydroelectric dam near Jablanica in central Bosnia and Herzegovina.
The lake has an irregular elongated shape. Its width varies along its length. The lake is a popular vacation destination in Bosnia and Herzegovina. Swimming, boating and especially fishing are popular activities on the lake. Many weekend cottages have been built along the shores of the lake.
There are 13 types of fish in the lake's ecosystem.

 Natural heritage and protection 
In dense water system network the Neretva holds a significant position among rivers of Dinaric Alps region, regarding its divers ecosystems and habitats, flora and fauna, cultural and historic heritage, but also as Area of Outstanding Natural Beauty and most importantly its clean, fresh drinking water.

 Fresh water resources 
One of the most valuable natural resource of Bosnia and Herzegovina is freshwater richness contained by an abundant wellspring and clear rivers, indeed, a natural treasure of great importance yet to be evaluated, acknowledge and appreciated. From the Drina river on the east to the Una river on the west and from the Sava river on the north to the Adriatic sea on the south, Bosnia and Herzegovina is genuine European freshwater reservoir. Situated in between all these major regional rivers the Neretva basin contain most significant portion of fresh drinking water.
The Upper Neretva water is Class I purity and almost certainly the coldest river water in the world, often as low as 7-8 degrees Celsius in the summer months.

 Endemic and endangered ichthyofauna 
Dinaric karst water systems inhabit 25% of the total of 546 fish species in Europe. Watercourses of this area are inhabited by a large number of endemic species of fish.
The river Neretva and its tributaries represent the main drainage system in the east Adriatic watershed and the foremost ichthyofaunal habitat of the region. According to Smith & Darwall (2006) the Neretva river, together with four other areas in the Mediterranean, has the largest number of threatened freshwater fish species.
Degree of endemism in the karst eco-region is greater than 10% of the total number of fish species. Numerous species of fish that inhabited this area live in very narrow and limited areal and are vulnerable, so they are included on the Red List of endangered fish and the IUCN-2006.
Upper Neretva inhabits three endemic and endangered species of fish. All of the endemic of Upper Neretva are rare and endangered trouts, the Neretva indigenous, autochthonal ichthyofauna.

 Salmonids 
Salmonids fishes from the Neretva basin show considerable variation in morphology, ecology and behaviour. The Neretva also has many other endemic and fragile life forms that are near extinction.
Among most endangered are three endemic species of the Neretva trout: Neretvan Softmouth trout (Salmothymus obtusirostris oxyrhinchus Steind.), Toothtrout ( also ) (Salmo dentex)and Marble trout ( also known as ) (Salmo marmoratus Cuv.).

All three endemic trout species of the Neretva are endangered mostly due to the habitat destruction or construction of large and major dams (large as higher than 15–20 m; major as over 150–250 m) in particular and hybridization or genetic pollution with introduced, non-native trouts, also from illegal fishing as well as poor management of water and fisheries especially in form of introduction of invasive allochthonous species (dams, overfishing, mismanagement, genetic pollution, invasive species).

 Dam problems 

The benefits brought by dams have often come at a great environmental and social cost, as dams destroy ecosystems and cause people to lose their homes and livelihoods.

The Neretva and two main tributaries are already harnessed, by four HE power-plants with large dams on Neretva, one HE power-plants with major dam on the Neretva tributary Rama, and two HE power-plants with one major dam on the Trebišnjica river, which is considered as part of the Neretva watershed.

Also, the government of the Federation of Bosnia and Herzegovina entity has unveiled plans to build three more hydroelectric power plants with major dams (as over 150.5 meters in height) upstream from the existing plants, beginning with Glavaticevo Hydro Power Plant in the nearby Glavatičevo village, then going even more upstream Bjelimići Hydro Power Plant and Ljubuča Hydro Power Plant located near the villages with a same names; and in addition one more at the Neretva headwaters gorge, near the very source of the river in entity of Republic of Srpska by its entity government. This, if realized, would completely destroyed this jewel among rivers, so its strongly opposed and protested by numerous environmentalist organizations and NGO's, domestic as well as international, who wish for the canyon, considered at least beautiful as the Tara canyon in Bosnia and Herzegovina and nearby Montenegro, to remain untouched and unspoiled, hopefully protected too.
Moreover, the same Government Of FBiH preparing a parallel plan to form a huge National Park which include entire region of Gornja Neretva, and within Park those three hydroelectric power plants, which is unheard in the history of environmental protection. The latest idea is that the park should be divided in two, where the Neretva should be excluded from both and, in fact, become the boundary between parks.
This is a cunning plan of engineers and related ministry in Government Of FBiH and should leave the river available for the construction of three large dams, and give them hope in order to remove the fear of contradiction in the plans for environmental protection in the area and the flooding its very heart, in terms of natural values - the Neretva. Of course, such deception failed, because the concerned citizens from the local community are not given bluff, as well as concerned citizens of whole country, and its particularly strongly opposed by NGOs and other institutions and organizations that are interested in establishing the National Park of Upper Neretva towards the professional and scientific principles and not according to the needs of electric energy lobby.Silenced Rivers: The Ecology and Politics of Large Dams, by Patrick McCully, Zed Books, London, 1996

Dam disasters

Outdoor recreation

 History  and culture 

 Early history 

There are a lot of reliable signs and evidences of human life in ancient period of this region. The oldest written record is actually a tombstone from the 2nd century AD raised by Elije Pinnes and Temus, parents of Pinniusu the Roman soldier of the 2.Legion Auxiliary. At the nearby Dernek were found many parts of ceramics from the Roman era.
From the Early Stone Age there is no evidence of living in Glavatičevo, although there are signs of ancient inhabitants in wider area. Pieces of ceramics from the Late Stone Age period were found in the sites of Gradac, Lonac and Vijenac near Razići, and sites of Šibenik and Kom near Kašići.

Middle ages

Numerous sources confirm that Glavatičevo area and the wider surrounding countryside, from the 12th century  until the arrival of the Ottoman empire, was very important for medieval Bosnian Kingdom, apart from the military significant, also, both economically and culturally.
Komska Župa ( = ), or area of the current Glavatičevo at that time was a very important road junction. For securing crossing over the Neretva river, near Glavatičevo has built town of Gradac with the citadel.
Center of the developed area was the old town of Kom, whose ruins are now preserved on the hard viable top mountain ridge above the village Kašići. The whole Župa area was named after the ancient town of Kom, Komska Župa. Kom was a significant military, economic and cultural center of ancient medieval Bosnian Kingdom and aristocratic Sanković family. The first written document on Kom originate from the 12th century, as part of the otherwise largely fictive text, "Ljetopis popa Dukljanina" by pop Dukljanin.
A lot of trading have been happening in Komska Župa at the time. Dubrovnik Republic (also Republic of Ragusa) had a leading role in this. 15 May 1391 Vojvoda ( = ) Radić Sanković issued Charter to Dubrovnik merchants that can trade on its territory, including Komsku Župu. As proof of this trading is discovery of coins from Dubrovnik Republic, as well as a document from 1381 which mentions the clearance of goods in this region. Thus, in Kom worked custom office.
At the end of 14th century Kom are still mentioned as a Župa ( = ). It was rare, because the other noble estates were already called principality. Therefore, the area Kom was continued to be called a Župa and that the name has been preserved to these days.
Aristocratic Kosača family governed Komska Župa until the second half of 1465. But two years earlier, 1463, after the war campaign, Turkish Sultan Mehmed II el Fatih conquered the area of Konjic and Kom, but that same year Herceg Stjepan Vukčić Kosača and his sons went to counterattack and restored Kom and its surrounding area. Two years is a peace reigned again, but in constant fear of a new Turkish attack. In mid-1465 The Turkish army under the command of Isa-Beg Isaković invaded the land of Herceg Stjepan and won. That was final fall of Kom.
Komska Župa became nahia and has been Kadiluku Blagaj. It can be seen from the list of Bosnian Sandžak from 1469 (During the Ottoman times Bosnia was both a single sanjak, and after 1580 a pashaluk divided into several sanjaks).

 Cultural heritage 
 Stećci 

The Stećci (singular: Stećak) are monumental medieval tombstones that lie scattered across the landscape of Bosnia and Herzegovina. They are the country’s most legendary symbol. Although many of them are found in Serbia and Croatia, the vast majority are found within the borders of Bosnia and Herzegovina – 60,000 in all, of which approximately 10,000 are decorated (and sometimes inscribed). Appearing in the 12th century, the stećci reached their peak in the late 14th to 15th centuries, before dying away during the Ottoman occupation. Their most remarkable feature is their decorative motifs, many of which remain enigmatic to this day. Although its origins are within the Bosnian Church, all evidence points to the fact that stećci were erected in due time by adherents of the Serbian Orthodox and Roman Catholic Bosnians alike.

District Komska Župa or Glavatičevo, is full stećci. Some of them, and there are hundreds, are a true rarity.
In the necropolis Sanković, at the Grčka glavica, in the area of Biskup village, there are about 115 stećak tombstones. The most famous is the stećak on the grave of Goisava Sanković, from aristocratic Sanković family. Among these decorated stećak, two are decorated with motifs of vines.
In Kasići there is a group of five stećak tombstones. One is decorated, and one has a label that was partially damaged, but can nevertheless be translated.
In Krupac, in one of two lone stećak, there is a drawing of Crescent.
Near Razići, at Crkvine hamlet, there is a huge necropolis of 93 stećak, decorated with the only three interesting themes. In one drawing is the human head, "that makes the spirits go away" and it is likely that below this carving, probably, a Bogumil was buried. On the second is carved cross which signified that under this stećak is a Christian, while the third stećak have a crescent moon under which, probably, rests a local inhabitant who accepted Islam.
The hamlet Račica at the place which is called Gromile, there are two lone stećak. One of them has two podiums, which is very rarely.
On the Visočica mountain, on the Poljica, in a really great necropolis tombstones are two stećak: Vukosav Lupčić and Rabrena Vukić with inscriptions

 Ancient road 
Roman road from Narona (Village Vid at Metković) ran over Nevesinjsko field and Dubrava, and on the location of Velika Poljana, near Lipeta, join with main rout. Solid construction of the Roman roads, making it clearly visible even today, from Lipeta to Vrabča. Milestones found in Konjic at the mouth of the Bijela river, in Polje, Borci village, Kuli, Malom Polju near Lipeta, all mentioning Roman emperors Augustus, Dacija, Tacitus, and Philip Augustus.  That means that the Romans constructed these roads sometime in the 1st century and with significant reconstructed during the 3rd century, and continuously used in the Middle Ages as the closest connection from Dubrovnik Republic with trading centers in Bosnia.
From Lipeta to Konjic, Roman Road and the Turkish route have been built almost on the same route. During Ottoman rule, there was a vital traffic between Sarajevo and Mostar. How important this road was in the Middle Ages Bosnia, tells us his name: "Džada Mostar", "Great road of Mostar" or "Sarajevo road".
Even the Romans had forts to ensure traffic and the protection of passengers on this rout. During the Middle Ages, except fortifications, along the way were built settlements. In Ottoman times along the way were made Karaula, with a mission to protect the passengers. Karaula are placed on peaks, canyons and places that are ideal for the attacker and the most dangerous for passengers.
Along the road shelters were built for the night sleep and rest of passing travelers. On the Roman road these shelters were called diversarium''. With diversarium was a shop, stable, shelter or barn, blacksmith's shop for repair of wagons and shoeing. After the fall of the Roman Empire, Roman road were neglected.
At the time of the Bosnian kings, all the imports and exports of goods going towards Dubrovnik Republic and back. People traveled with caravans and lodged under the starry sky, there were fewer shalters at the time like in Konjic and Vrabč. After the occupation of Bosnia by the Ottoman empire, a new shelters called hans were built. Hans served for lodging and accommodation of travelers called "kiridžija" and their caravans, but also the trade took place in these hans as well. During the Ottoman rule hans were a form of "bed and breakfast" facilities, to meet basic needs, these were buildings with dining room, rooms for passengers, room for hadžije, shops, stables for horses.

See also

References

Sources

External links 

 
Rivers of Bosnia and Herzegovina
Tourist attractions in Bosnia and Herzegovina
Tourism in Bosnia and Herzegovina
Protected areas of Bosnia and Herzegovina
Nature conservation in Bosnia and Herzegovina
Environment of Bosnia and Herzegovina
0Upper Neretva
Neretva
History of Bosnia and Herzegovina by location
Glavatičevo
Historical regions of Bosnia and Herzegovina
Recreational fishing in Bosnia and Herzegovina